Alan Longmuir (20 June 1948 – 2 July 2018) was a Scottish musician and a founding member of the 1970s pop group, the Bay City Rollers.  He played the bass guitar in the band whilst his younger brother Derek Longmuir was drummer.

Biography
Longmuir was born at Simpson Memorial Maternity Pavilion Hospital, Edinburgh. His father was an undertaker. A member of a musical family, he formed his first band at the age of 17, with his brother Derek and two others. They changed their name and line-up to become the Bay City Rollers. Until their career took off, he worked as a plumber.

In 1976, at the height of the band's popularity, Alan Longmuir left and was replaced by rhythm guitarist Ian Mitchell, who was ten years his junior. Tam Paton, then the group's manager, alleged that Longmuir had tried to commit suicide. Paton's own conduct was later revealed as a contributory factor in the unhappiness of some band members.

In 1977, Longmuir released "I'm Confessing", which peaked at number 44 in Australia.

Longmuir returned to the group in 1978 following McGlynn's departure, and thereafter switched between bass guitar, rhythm guitar and keyboards.  He also played piano accordion.

Longmuir was married twice, briefly to Jan Longmuir, from 1985 until their divorce in 1990; they had one son, Jordan. His second, lasting marriage was to Eileen Rankin Longmuir, from 1998 until his death; Eileen had two sons of her own, to whom Alan was a devoted step-father.

While owner of the Castle Campbell Hotel in Dollar, Clackmannanshire, he suffered two heart attacks and a stroke, and in 2000 he decided to retrain as a building inspector.

Longmuir died on 2 July 2018 at Forth Valley Royal Hospital in Larbert, Scotland, after contracting an illness while on holiday in Mexico, where he had been a patient at the Galenia Hospital in Cancún but had been cleared to return home. He was 70 years old.

References

Bibliography
 Stambler, Irwin, Encyclopedia of Pop, rock & Soul. 1974. St. Martin's Press, Inc., New York, New York, 

1948 births
2018 deaths
People from South Ayrshire
Scottish bass guitarists
Scottish keyboardists
Scottish multi-instrumentalists
Scottish songwriters
Bay City Rollers members
Musicians from Edinburgh